The 2014 Safeway Championship, Manitoba's provincial men's curling championship, was held from January 29 to February 2 at the MTS Iceplex in Winnipeg, Manitoba.  The winning Jeff Stoughton team represented Manitoba at the 2014 Tim Hortons Brier in Kamloops, British Columbia.

Teams

Draw
32 team double knockout with playoff round
Four teams qualify each from A Event and B Event

A Event

B Event

Results
All draws are listed in Central Standard Time (UTC−6).

Draw 1
Thursday, January 29, 8:30am

Draw 2
Thursday, January 29, 12:15pm

Draw 3
Thursday, January 29, 4:00pm

Draw 4
Thursday, January 29, 8:15pm

Draw 5
Friday, January 30, 8:30am

Draw 6
Friday, January 30, 12:15pm

Draw 7
Friday, January 30, 4:00pm

Draw 8
Friday, January 30, 7:45pm

Draw 9
Saturday, January 31, 8:30am

Draw 10
Saturday, January 31, 12:15pm

Draw 11
Saturday, January 31, 4:00pm

Playoffs

Playoff round
8 team double knockout
Four teams qualify into Championship Round

First round
Friday, January 31, 7:45pm

Second round
Saturday, February 1, 9:00am

Third round
Saturday, February 1, 2:00pm

Championship Round

1 vs. 2
Saturday, February 1, 6:00 pm

3 vs. 4
Saturday, February 1, 6:00 pm

Semifinal
Sunday, February 2, 9:30 am

Final
Sunday, February 2, 2:00 pm

References
Team list

2014 Tim Hortons Brier
2014 in Manitoba
Curling competitions in Winnipeg